Yermishinsky District is an administrative and municipal district (raion), one of the twenty-five in Ryazan Oblast, Russia. It is located in the northeast of the oblast. Its administrative center is the urban locality (a work settlement) of Yermish. Population: 8,879 (2010 Census);  The population of Yermish accounts for 48.9% of the district's total population.

Notable residents 

Ivan Vlasov (1903–1969), politician, nominal head of state of the RSFSR under Stalin, born in Nikolayevka

References

Notes

Sources

Districts of Ryazan Oblast